Exodus (出埃及記) is a 2007 Hong Kong black comedy thriller film written, produced and directed by Pang Ho-cheung and starring Simon Yam.

Cast and roles
 Simon Yam as Sergeant Tsim Kin-yip
 Annie Liu as Ann
 Nick Cheung as Kwan Ping-man
 Maggie Shiu as Fong
 Irene Wan as Pun Siu-yuen
 Candice Yu as Ann's mother
 Pal Sinn as Ann's father
 Gordon Lam as Renovation contractor Fai
 Jim Chim as Man in wheelchair
 Gregory Charles Rivers as Duty officer
 Sire Ma as Bridesmaid
 Siu Yam-yam as Professor teaching poison 
 Cheuk Wan-chi as Professor teaching electronic

Critical reception
The film opened to generally very positive reviews with the Hong Kong press. Perry Lam, in Muse, praised Simon Yam's performance, claiming the film featured 'the best acting that the prolific and still under-recognised Yam has done.'

References

External links
 IMDb entry
 HK Cinemagic entry

2007 films
2007 black comedy films
2000s comedy thriller films
Hong Kong comedy thriller films
Hong Kong black comedy films
Police detective films
Films directed by Pang Ho-cheung
Films set in Hong Kong
Films shot in Hong Kong
2007 comedy films
2000s Hong Kong films